Kristin Aslaug Persson is a Swedish/Icelandic American physicist and chemist. She was born in Lund, Sweden in 1971, to Eva Haettner-Aurelius  and Einar Benedikt Olafsson. She is a Faculty Senior Staff Scientist at Lawrence Berkeley National Laboratory and the Daniel M. Tellep Distinguished Professor of Materials Science and Engineering at University of California, Berkeley. Currently, she is also the Director of the Molecular Foundry, a national user facility managed by the US Department of Energy at Lawrence Berkeley National Laboratory. Persson is the Director and Co-Founder of the Materials Project, a multi-national effort to compute the properties of all inorganic materials. Her research group  focuses on the data-driven computational design and prediction of new materials for clean energy production and storage applications.

Education 
Persson holds a Master of Science in Engineering Physics from Lund Institute of Technology in Sweden and completed a Ph.D. in Theoretical Physics from Royal Institute of Technology (KTH) in Sweden in 2001, under the supervision of Göran Grimvall. After her Ph.D., she joined the Massachusetts Institute of Technology as a postdoctoral associate from 2001-2002 and 2004-2007.

Awards and honors 

 2023: The Dresselhaus Memorial Lecture, IWAM 2023 
 2022: AAAS Fellow 
 2022: Cooper Lecture, West Virginia University 
 2022: Secretary of Energy's Achievement Award
 2021: Fellow of the American Physical Society
 2020, 2021, 2022: Highly Cited Researcher, by Web of Science
2020: Falling Walls Award in Science and Innovation Management
2018: Kavli Fellow
 2018: Secretary of Energy's Achievement Award
 2017: TMS Early Career Faculty Fellow Award
 2013: Director's Awards for Exceptional Achievement: Scientific

References

External links
 

University of California, Berkeley faculty
Women physicists
Year of birth missing (living people)
Living people
Fellows of the American Physical Society